Peter Turang (born 23 February 1947), sometimes also known as Petrus Turang is an Indonesian Roman Catholic archbishop .

Biography
Turang was born in Tataaran, Minahasa Regency in North Sulawesi. He was ordained a priest on 18 December 1974.

Turang held the position of executive secretary of the Indonesian Economic and Social Development Commission at the Indonesian Bishops' Conference. On 21 April 1997 Truang was appointed coadjutor archbishop of the archdiocese of Kupang to replace the then-current archbishop Gregorius Manteiro, who was in poor health. On 27 July 1997 Turang was ordained bishop by Cardinal Julius Darmaatmadja. Turang officially succeeded Manteiro at the latter's death on 10 October 1997.

Turang caused some controversy in the Indonesian Catholic community when he reprimanded a priest named Romo Yohanes Subani. Subani who is an educator and instructor at St. Michael High Seminary in Kupang, did not kiss the bishop's ring on January 10, 2013 after a joint Christmas celebration at Kupang Cathedral Church, causing Turang to publicly admonish Subani in front of the congregation. Both Turang and to a lesser extent Subani were criticized for their conduct. Turang initially defended his behavior, but later made an apology.

References

External links

1947 births
Living people
People from Minahasa Regency
20th-century Roman Catholic archbishops in Indonesia
Minahasa people
21st-century Roman Catholic archbishops in Indonesia